"The Most Dangerous Game", also published as "The Hounds of Zaroff", is a short story by Richard Connell, first published in Collier's on January 19, 1924, with illustrations by Wilmot Emerton Heitland. The story features a big-game hunter from New York City who falls from a yacht and swims to what seems to be an abandoned and isolated island in the Caribbean, where he is hunted by a Russian aristocrat. The story is inspired by the big-game hunting safaris in Africa and South America that were particularly fashionable among wealthy Americans in the 1920s.

The story has been adapted numerous times, most notably as the 1932 RKO Pictures film The Most Dangerous Game, starring Joel McCrea, Leslie Banks and Fay Wray, and for a 1943 episode of the CBS Radio series Suspense, starring Orson Welles. It has been called the "most popular short story ever written in English." Upon its publication, it won the O. Henry Award. 

"The Most Dangerous Game" is one of many works that entered the public domain in the United States in 2020.

Plot 
Big-game hunter Sanger Rainsford and his friend Whitney are traveling by ship to the Amazon rainforest for a jaguar hunt. After a discussion about the nearby Ship-Trap Island, which has an evil reputation among sailors, Whitney goes to bed while Rainsford stays on deck to smoke his pipe. Hearing gunshots in the distance, he rushes to the rail for a better look and accidentally falls overboard. Rainsford swims to Ship-Trap and finds an opulent chateau inhabited by two Cossacks: the owner, General Zaroff, and his gigantic deaf-mute servant, Ivan.

Zaroff, another big-game hunter, knows of Rainsford from his published account of hunting snow leopards in Tibet. Over dinner, the middle-aged Zaroff explains that although he has been hunting animals since he was a boy, he has decided that killing big game has become boring for him. After escaping the Russian Revolution, he purchased Ship-Trap, built a home for himself, and rigged the island with lights to lure passing ships into the jagged rocks that surround it. He takes the survivors captive and hunts them for sport, giving them food, clothing, a knife, and a head start of several hours, and using only a small-caliber pistol for himself. Any captives who can elude Zaroff, Ivan, and a pack of hunting dogs for three days are set free. He reveals that he has won every hunt to date. Captives are offered a choice between being hunted or turned over to Ivan, who once served as official knouter for the Great White Czar. Rainsford denounces the hunt as barbarism, but Zaroff replies by claiming that "life is for the strong." Zaroff is enthused to have another world-class hunter as a companion and, at breakfast, offers to take Rainsford along with him on his next hunt. Rainsford staunchly refuses and demands to leave the island, disappointing Zaroff who then has another epiphany: he will hunt Rainsford. Zaroff becomes impersonal and lays out the parameters of the game as he would to any captive sailor. Rainsford reluctantly accepts the terms and receives his equipment from Ivan.

During his head start, Rainsford lays an intricate trail in the forest and then climbs a tree. Zaroff finds him easily, but decides to play with him as a cat would with a mouse, standing underneath the tree Rainsford is hiding in, smoking a cigarette, and then abruptly departing. After the failed attempt at eluding Zaroff, Rainsford builds a Malay man-catcher, a weighted log attached to a trigger. This contraption slightly wounds Zaroff's shoulder, causing him to return home for the night, but he shouts his respect for the trap before departing. The next day Rainsford creates a Burmese tiger pit, which kills one of Zaroff's hounds. He sacrifices his knife and ties it to a sapling to make another trap, which kills Ivan when he stumbles into it. To escape Zaroff and his approaching hounds, Rainsford dives off a cliff into the sea and escapes. Zaroff, disappointed at Rainsford's apparent suicide, returns home. Zaroff smokes a pipe by his fireplace, but two issues keep him from attaining peace of mind: the difficulty of replacing Ivan and the uncertainty of whether Rainsford perished in his dive.

Zaroff locks himself in his bedroom and turns on the lights, only to find Rainsford waiting for him, who swam in order to sneak into the chateau without the dogs finding him. Zaroff congratulates him on winning the "game", but Rainsford decides to fight him, saying he is still a beast-at-bay and that the original hunt is not over. Accepting the challenge, a delighted Zaroff says that the loser will be fed to the dogs, while the winner will sleep in his bed. Then the story abruptly concludes later that night by stating that Rainsford enjoyed the comfort of the bed, implying that he won the duel and killed Zaroff.

Real-life parallels 
In 1976, Hayes Noel, Bob Gurnsey, and Charles Gaines discussed Gaines's recent trip to Africa and his experiences hunting African buffalo. Inspired in part by Gaines's memories and in part by "The Most Dangerous Game", they created paintball in 1981.

There is a possible reference to "The Most Dangerous Game" in letters that the Zodiac Killer wrote to newspapers in the San Francisco Bay Area in his three-part cipher: "Man is the most dangerous animal of all to kill", though he may have come up with the idea independently. The 1932 film version of The Most Dangerous Game is mentioned a number of times in the 2007 film, Zodiac, a fictionalized depiction of the Zodiac Killer.

Clive Cussler wrote a book entitled Dragon in which he mentions Richard Connell's "The Most Dangerous Game" and actually has a long few chapters where his Japanese manhunter emulates the story. It takes place on a small isolated island and in every way is the same as the Connell story.

Adaptations

See also 
 Robert Hansen

Citations

General and cited sources

External links 

 "The Most Dangerous Game" by Richard Connell at Duke of Definition: English on the Web
 "The Most Dangerous Game" by Richard Connell at The Fresh Reads

1924 short stories
American short stories
Fiction about death games
Hunting in popular culture
Short stories adapted into films
Works originally published in Collier's